is a Japanese football player who plays for Thespakusatsu Gunma.

National team career
In October 2009, Uchida was elected Japan U-17 national team for 2009 U-17 World Cup. He served as captain and played full time in all 3 matches as center back.

Club statistics
As of end of 2018 season.

Reserves performance

Honours

Club
Gamba Osaka
J1 League (1) : 2014
J2 League (1) : 2013
Emperor's Cup (2) : 2014, 2015
J.League Cup (1) : 2014

References

External links
Profile at Tokyo Verdy

j-league

1992 births
Living people
Association football people from Hyōgo Prefecture
Japanese footballers
Japan youth international footballers
J1 League players
J2 League players
J3 League players
Gamba Osaka players
Gamba Osaka U-23 players
Tokyo Verdy players
Thespakusatsu Gunma players
Association football midfielders